Ramularia coryli is a fungal plant pathogen infecting hazelnuts.

References

Fungal plant pathogens and diseases
Hazelnut tree diseases
coryli
Fungi described in 1998